Ermin Melunović (born 18 May 1973) is a Serbian former professional footballer who spent his career primarily in Germany.

References

External links
 

1973 births
Living people
People from Prijepolje
Serbian footballers
2. Bundesliga players
SV Wehen Wiesbaden players
SV Eintracht Trier 05 players
1. FSV Mainz 05 players
1. FC Schweinfurt 05 players
SSV Jahn Regensburg players
Fortuna Düsseldorf players
SV Waldhof Mannheim players
SV Darmstadt 98 players
Viktoria Aschaffenburg players
Expatriate footballers in Germany
Association football forwards
Serbian expatriate sportspeople in Germany
Expatriate footballers in Austria
Serbian expatriate sportspeople in Austria
Serbian expatriate footballers